This is a list of programs currently, formerly, and soon to be broadcast on Antena 3, in Spain.

References

Further reading 

 España, Ramón de. La caja de las sorpresas. 2001. Editorial Planeta. 
 Sempere Bernal, Antonio. Locos por la tele 2005. 
 Valezuela, Javier. Usted puede ser tertuliano 2011. Ediciones Península. 

Antena 3
Ant
Antena 3 (Spanish TV channel)